Boea is a genus of plants in the family Gesneriaceae, with species originating from Australia, China, India, Malaysia, Myanmar, Philippines, Polynesia, Solomon Islands, Thailand, Papua New Guinea, Indonesia, Nepal, Bhutan, Cambodia, Vietnam and Laos.

It grows along creek beds, on moist banks, moss-covered rocks in rainforest, open forest, vine forest and gallery forest.

Some Boea species are known as types of resurrection plant due to their ability to survive desiccation (e.g. B. hygrometrica and B. hygroscopica).

Cultivation
These cultivation notes are based on B. hygroscopica, a species from Northern Queensland, Australia.

A well-drained soil is suggested for this plant, achieved by using a potting mix with 20% sand content, and 5mm (~0.2 inches) of scoria or other drainage material in the bottom of the pot. A fertilizer with an NPK ratio of about 13.8:3.2:9.9, plus trace elements, is recommended.

This plant prefers bright, filtered light, possibly with some early-morning direct sun. It can be planted in the garden in a well-drained, consistently moist location.

The only major pests of this plant are chewing insects such as grasshoppers and caterpillars.

Species
The Smithsonian lists the following Boea species.

The Smithsonian also lists:
Kaisupeea herbacea with the basionym: Boea herbacea
Leptoboea multiflora  with the previous synonym Boea multiflora

References

Didymocarpoideae
Gesneriaceae genera
House plants